Dragan Babić (3 September 1937 – 23 July 2013) was a Serbian and Yugoslav journalist.

He was born in Kruševac, Kingdom of Yugoslavia, and died in Vranje, Serbia.

His major works include the books Journey to the End of Language and You Maybe Think Different, and the documentary Like a Soap Bubble. He created several television shows including the children's show Dvogled ("Binoculars").

References

1937 births
2013 deaths
Writers from Kruševac
Serbian journalists
Yugoslav journalists
Serbian science fiction writers